The 2003 Pacific Games women's football tournament was the inaugural edition of Pacific Games women's football tournament. The competition was held in Fiji from 30 June to 10 July 2003..

Group stage

See also
Pacific Games

References

External links
Details on RSSSF website

2003
Football at the 2003 South Pacific Games
Pac
2003 South Pacific Games